Elections to Ards Borough Council were held on 18 May 1977 on the same day as the other Northern Irish local government elections. The election used three district electoral areas to elect a total of 17 councillors.

Election results

Note: "Votes" are the first preference votes.

Districts summary

|- class="unsortable" align="centre"
!rowspan=2 align="left"|Ward
! % 
!Cllrs
! % 
!Cllrs
! % 
!Cllrs
! % 
!Cllrs
! %
!Cllrs
! %
!Cllrs
!rowspan=2|TotalCllrs
|- class="unsortable" align="center"
!colspan=2 bgcolor="" | UUP
!colspan=2 bgcolor="" | Alliance
!colspan=2 bgcolor="" | DUP
!colspan=2 bgcolor="" | NILP
!colspan=2 bgcolor="" | SDLP
!colspan=2 bgcolor="white"| Others
|-
|align="left"|Area A
|bgcolor="40BFF5"|32.1
|bgcolor="40BFF5"|3
|23.3
|2
|12.5
|1
|0.0
|0
|14.7
|1
|17.4
|0
|7
|-
|align="left"|Area B
|bgcolor="40BFF5"|30.1
|bgcolor="40BFF5"|2
|21.2
|2
|13.0
|1
|22.5
|1
|0.0
|0
|13.2
|0
|6
|-
|align="left"|Area C
|bgcolor="40BFF5"|33.8
|bgcolor="40BFF5"|1
|16.5
|1
|13.1
|1
|0.0
|0
|0.0
|0
|36.6
|1
|4
|-
|- class="unsortable" class="sortbottom" style="background:#C9C9C9"
|align="left"| Total
|31.8
|6
|20.8
|5
|13.8
|3
|8.0
|1
|5.7
|1
|19.9
|1
|17
|-
|}

Districts results

Area A

1973: 6 x UUP, 1 x SDLP
1977: 3 x UUP, 2 x Alliance, 1 x DUP, 1 x SDLP
1973-1977 Change: Alliance (two seats) and DUP gain from UUP (three seats)

Area B

1973: 3 x UUP, 1 x Alliance, 1 x NILP, 1 x Loyalist
1977: 2 x UUP, 2 x Alliance, 1 x NILP, 1 x DUP
1973-1977 Change: Alliance and DUP gain from UUP and Loyalist

Area C

1973: 2 x UUP, 1 x Alliance, 1 x Independent Unionist
1977: 1 x UUP, 1 x Alliance, 1 x DUP, 1 x Independent Unionist
1973-1977 Change: DUP gain from Independent Unionist

References

Ards Borough Council elections
Ards